J45 may refer to:
 Gibson J-45, an acoustic guitar
 Gyroelongated square bicupola
 , a minesweeper of the Royal Navy
 LNER Class J45, a British diesel locomotive class